The discography of Mexican Ranchera/Latin pop singer-songwriter Alejandro Fernández.

Albums

Studio albums

Live albums

Compilation albums

Singles

References

Latin pop music discographies
Discographies of Mexican artists
Regional Mexican music discographies